So This Is New York is a 1948 satirical movie comedy starring acerbic radio and television comedian Henry Morgan and directed by Richard Fleischer. The cynically sophisticated screenplay was written by Carl Foreman and Herbert Baker from the 1920 novel The Big Town by Ring Lardner. Foreman was blacklisted soon after.

It remains the only film in which humorist Henry Morgan plays the leading role, and the material was tailored to showcase the cynical persona Morgan had developed for his radio show.

The film was the second feature directed by Richard Fleischer (son of Max Fleischer), who had previously directed short subjects for United Artists. Fleischer went on to direct Follow Me Quietly (1948), Armored Car Robbery (1950), and The Narrow Margin (1954). It was also the first film produced by Stanley Kramer.

Plot
At the end of World War I, Ella Finch and her sister Kate inherit $30,000 each. Ella then announces her dissatisfaction with life in South Bend, Indiana, and with Kate's butcher/boyfriend Willis. She is convinced she can find Kate a rich husband in New York City. Ella's wisecracking cigar salesman/husband Ernie is unable to change her mind, so he reluctantly accompanies the pair east—which is not a bad idea, considering his wife almost immediately becomes victim to a wolf in stockbroker's clothing.

In New York, the Finches find a spacious apartment and meet their wealthy neighbor, Lucius Trumbull, who invites them over for drinks. Ella is delighted, but not Kate. After all, Trumbull is approaching retirement age. Later, the trio encounter Herbert Daley, a Southern-gentleman racehorse owner. But Kate sets her sights on Daley's jockey, Sid Mercer, who reciprocates in kind. But Daley subsequently regains the inside track, and he and Kate become engaged. A drunk and embittered Sid plots his revenge. He confides to Ernie that Daley has conspired to fix the next day's race, but Sid will double cross his employer by ensuring a longshot wins. Sid's plot succeeds. When last seen, Daley is running for his life, his co-conspirators in hot pursuit. Meanwhile, Ernie, having profited off a bet on the longshot, accidentally runs into his employer and is summarily fired.

The Finches are thus forced to move to a seedy theatrical hotel, where they meet Ziegfeld Follies star and comedian Jimmy Ralston. He reveals his ambition is to write, produce, and star in a serious play. Ignoring Ernie's objections, Kate and Ella invest what's left of their inheritance. The play premieres to audience ridicule, and the critics pronounce it a flop. Ernie is unconcerned since he still has the money he won at the races. But Ella reveals she found his stash and invested it too. Fortunately, Ernie's employer, experiencing a change of heart, miraculously appears and offers him his job back. In the end, they all happily return to South Bend, wiser for the experience.

Cast
Henry Morgan as Ernie Finch
Rudy Vallee as Herbert Daley
Bill Goodwin as Jimmy Ralston 
Hugh Herbert as Lucius Trumbull
Leo Gorcey	as Sid Mercer
Virginia Grey as Ella Goff Finch
Dona Drake	as Kate Goff 
Jerome Cowan as Francis Griffin
Dave Willock as Willis Gilbey
Frank Orth	as A. J. Gluskoter
Arnold Stang as Western Union Clerk
William Bakewell as Hotel Clerk

Production
Kramer and Foreman borrowed Richard Fleischer from RKO after they saw his debut feature, Child of Divorce.

The film was made on a small budget, "a little more than $600,000 ... cobbled together from several small-time non-Hollywood investors, including a dry goods salesman and a lettuce grower".

So This Is New York was one of the first Hollywood movies to use the technique of freezing action on the screen while the narrator, Henry Morgan, spoke about what the viewer was seeing. One scene has Morgan entering a taxi as a cabbie barks at him in a thick Bronx accent, "Awrite - where to, Mac?" Subtitles appear on the screen translating, "Where may I take you, sir?"

Reception
It was a flop when it was first released, but is now "a favorite of many film buffs and critics". When the Tribeca Film Festival decided to include a Stanley Kramer film, noted director Martin Scorsese surprised Kramer's widow by requesting So This Is New York, rather than any of his better known works.

References

External links

The Big Town by Ring Lardner (1920 novel)

1948 films
1948 comedy films
American comedy films
American satirical films
American black-and-white films
1940s English-language films
Films scored by Dimitri Tiomkin
Films based on American novels
Films directed by Richard Fleischer
Films set in Indiana
Films set in New York City
Metro-Goldwyn-Mayer films
Films with screenplays by Carl Foreman
1940s American films